Leonora Sansay (December 11, 1773 – 1821) was an American novelist. She was the author of Secret History; or, The Horrors of St. Domingo, in a Series of Letters Written by a Lady at Cape Francois to Col. Burr, late Vice-President of the United States, Principally During the Command of General Rochambeau (Philadelphia, 1808) and Laura (Philadelphia, 1809), and possibly three other novels: Zelica: The Creole (London, 1820); The Scarlet Handkerchief (London, 1823); and The Stranger in Mexico (not extant).

Biography
She was born Honora Davern in Philadelphia on December 11, 1773, to Rosa and William Davern, the latter of whom died at sea a few weeks after her birth, probably in January 1774. On Valentine's Day 1779, her mother married a Philadelphia innkeeper named William Hassel (sometimes Hassal); Sansay's stepfather maintained Hassal's Tavern (or The Half Moon — a generic name for an English pub), which was located across from the State House (Independence Hall), where local politicians and members of Congress often met informally.

Rosa and William Hassel had two children of their own, Sansay's half-siblings, Mary (born November 12, 1781) and William (born December 24, 1784). Incidentally, it was Mary who has often been mistakenly credited with the authorship of Secret History and Laura (the mistake derives from the name of the author-character of Secret History, also named Mary).

At some point in the mid- to late 1790s (she shows up in the Philadelphia City Directory for 1796 as "Eleonora Hassel, Gentlewoman"), Sansay met Aaron Burr, who became her confidant and patron. (Sansay stated that she met him after the death of her fiancé, who had left a letter leaving her and their unborn child "to his protection." While there are scattered references in Secret History to Leonora's son, it is unknown what became of her child, if indeed she did have one.) Some scholars believe Burr and Sansay were lovers, but this is contested by Van Bergen. Burr continued to play an important role in Sansay's life until she disappeared from the historical record.

Leonora writes in Secret History that Burr convinced her to marry Louis Sansay (St. Louis), then a New York merchant having fled his plantation in Saint-Domingue (now Haïti), a French colony subject to a massive slave uprising that would ultimately end with the declaration of Haitian Independence in 1804. In early 1802, Louis Sansay made plans to return to Haiti to reclaim his property. He sent Leonora to visit Burr in Washington to obtain letters of recommendation and a passport for Louis. Corroborating the purpose of Leonora's visit, Burr also wrote to his cousin, Pierpont Edwards:

Louis Sansay wrote Burr several letters during the time Leonora stayed in Washington with Burr. In these letters, Louis asked that, "considering the affection and the attachment that you always have attested for [Leonora]", Burr would "employ yourself for us ... to obtain for me at the expense of the French government my passage [to Haiti] and that of my wife, my daughter and of my two servants by making him see that I am without means." Louis thanked Burr for "all the kindnesses that you were willing to show for her and for me" and informed Burr that he was taking Leonora with him to Haiti (despite the dangers there), that he hoped Burr would urge her to return to New York as soon as possible to set sail with Louis, "as it is impossible for me to be happy without her possession very near."

Each subsequent letter after Louis' first one manifested increasing anxiety on his part about Leonora. Finally, on April 2, Louis wrote Burr with "horrible anxiety" about Leonora, saying it had been nine days and he had received only one letter from her, claiming he feared she was ill, but contradicting himself by charging her with "flightineses and fickleness" and claiming "I tremble that her intention is to abandon me." Declaring he would "sacrifice even my life rather than to see her in the possession of another," Louis begged Burr "to reassure my heart, which is broken with pain," "to urge her to come back as promptly as possible." Trying to convince Burr that he only had "her happiness and mine" at heart, Louis promised to bestow $12,000 dollars upon her (even though in his 3/22 letter, he had stated that "after all the misfortunes that I endured, sir, recently and my resources being almost exhausted") if Burr could manage to get her to go to Haiti with him.

Leonora returned to Louis and the couple embarked for Haiti in late May or early June. From Haiti, Sansay continued corresponding with Burr; these letters form the basis for Sansay's first book, Secret History. They describe the final days of French rule on the island.

After departing Haiti, Leonora and Louis lived for a time in Cuba. But when his "intolerable and groundless jealousy" grew to the point where "[i]n every man that approached me he saw a rival" and when he "came home [one night] in a transport of fury, dragged me from my bed, said it was his intention to destroy me, and swore that he would render me horrible by rubbing aqua-fortis [nitric acid] in my face," Leonora left him, escaping in the dark of night to a remote village 12 miles away.

Eventually Sansay made her way to Jamaica and back to Philadelphia. She next played a part in Burr's alleged 1806–07 conspiracy, for which he was indicted (and acquitted) for high misdemeanor and treason in 1807. Sansay appears in a March 1, 1808 news item in The Richmond Enquirer under one of her pseudonyms, Madame D'Auvergne, an apparent francisation of her birth name (Davern). (See Thomas Abernethy, Burr Conspiracy (1954), p. 270 - Robert T. Spence testified he had sailed from Philadelphia to New Orleans "with Bollman, Alexander, and a Madame D'Auvergne, alias Nora Haskel"]. See also Davis, Private Journal of AB, Mrs. --- to Burr, 11-6-1808, 1:78-79 - "Just before I left New-Orleans I received a present of elegant medals from my friend in Mexico." Architect Benjamin Latrobe also noted Leonora's presence in New Orleans: Benjamin H. Latrobe, The Correspondence and Miscellaneous Papers of Benjamin Henry Latrobe, John C. Van Horne and Lee W. Formwalt, eds., Papers Of Benjamin Henry Latrobe Series, Series 4, 1805-1810. (New Haven, 1987), 2:259 - He wrote to Lewis DeMun in New Orleans: "If you see M. D'Avergne [sic], say every thing that the sincerest respect would prompt.")

After the Burr trial, Sansay returned again to Philadelphia and wrote and published Secret History; or, The Horrors of St. Domingo, in a Series of Letters Written by a Lady at Cape Francois to Col. Burr, late Vice-President of the United States, Principally During the Command of General Rochambeau. The following year, Sansay's Laura appeared in print from the same press, Bradford & Inskeep. She set up a flower manufacturing business with the help of Eric Bollman.

Later life
Sansay makes periodic appearances in Burr's correspondence, though the vast majority of these letters have been lost. Burr shared her letters with Jeremy Bentham while in exile in Europe after his acquittal.

Further references to Leonora may be found under the names "Clara" and "Mme. D'Auvergne" in Burr's "Private Journal" at: 1:30 [Eric Bollman to AB, 8-11-1808]; 1:78 [Mrs. --- to Burr <Phila.>, 11-6-1808](also in Drexler, pp. 231–32); 1:84-85 [Bollman to AB, 11-12/1808, corroborates Mrs. --- 11-6 letter]; 1:146 [Burr journal entry, 1-20-1809]; 1:149 [Burr journal entry, 2-1-1809; Davis footnote identifying Clara as "Madame D'Auvergne, but better known as Leonora Sansay, author of the Horrors of St. Domingo"]; 1:170 [AB to Jeremy Bentham, 1-23-1809]; 1:242 [Theodosia Burr Alston to AB, 5-31-1809]; 2:440-46 [Mrs. L****** to AB (Phila.), 7-29-1812 - refers to Bollman](also in Drexler, pp. 232–35).

More references are in M.L. Davis Memoirs of AB: 2:175 [Mrs. ****** to AB, 2-9-1802 - 2 months before her departure for Haiti; not ascertained to be from LS]; 2:323 [AB to TBA, 7-10-1804 - letters of Clara sometimes "L" - shortly before Burr's duel]; 2:326 [AB to Joseph Alston, 7-10-1804, "Madame Sansay, too well known under the name of Leonora, has claims on my recollection."]. See also Charles Burdett, Margaret Moncrieffe: The First Love of Aaron Burr (1860), pp. 428–37, reprinted in Michael J. Drexler's edition of Secret History and Laura, pp. 223–31. And Mary-Jo Kline, Political Correspondence & Public Papers of Aaron Burr (1983) 2:70, AB to Pierpont Edwards, 3-20-1802.

Maxwell Struthers Burt wrote in Philadelphia: Holy Experiment (1947) that Sansay was "mysterious and will remain mysterious," adding "Discreet historians have abandoned her in despair on the principles that if you ignore something it won't bite you" (p. 236).

Two other novels may be attributed to Sansay: Zelica, the Creole (1820) and The Scarlet Handkerchief (1823). Both were published in London, but indicate that they were transmitted from America. The flyleaf for "Zelica, the Crole" advertises the author's other works as follows: "In the press, by the same author, The Scarlet Handkerchief, 3 vols. The Stranger in Mexico, 3 vols. Which, with Zelica, the Creole, now published, from a Series of Novels that have been transmitted to the Publisher from America"  Likewise,  The Scarlet Handkerchief credits "An American, also the author of Zelica, the Creole" as its author. The third novel, A Stranger in Mexico, is promoted, though no copies have been found.  It is unknown why or when Sansay traveled to England, but she appears to have died there.  Her interment on November 12, 1821, in the Parish of Newent, County of Gloucester is recorded in the Church of England Burials.

Works
Secret History; or, The Horrors of St. Domingo (Philadelphia, 1808)
Laura (Philadelphia, 1809)
Zelica, the Creole (London, 1820)
The Scarlet Handkerchief (London, 1823)
The Stranger in Mexico (not extant)

Notes

References 

 Abernethy, Timothy P. Burr Conspiracy, (New York: 1954).
 Davis, Matthew L. Memoirs of Aaron Burr, (New York: 1836) 2 vols.
 Davis, Matthew L., ed. Private Journal of Aaron Burr: During His Residence Of Four Years In Europe, (New York: 1838, 1970) 2 vols.
 Drexler, Michael. The Displacement of the American Novel: Imagining Aaron Burr and Haiti in Leonora Sansay's Secret History, Common-Place, vol. 9, no. 3, April 2009. <http://www.common-place.org/vol-09/no-03/drexler/
 Dillon, Elizabeth. The Secret History of the Early American Novel: Leonora Sansay and Revolution in Saint-Domingue, Novel 40:1/2 (2006): 77–105.
 Kline, Mary-Jo. Political Correspondence & Public Papers of Aaron Burr, (Princeton: 1983), 2:703.
 Lapsansky, Philip S. Afro-Americana: Rediscovering Leonora Sansay, in "The Annual Report of the Library Company of Philadelphia for the Year 1992" (Philadelphia: Library Company of Philadelphia, 1993), pp. 29–46.
 Sansay, Leonora. Secret History; or, The Horrors of St. Domingo and Laura, Michael J. Drexler ed. (Peterborough, Ontario: Broadview Press: 2007;1808).
 Van Bergen, Jennifer. Reconstructing Leonora Sansay, <http://www.a-w-i-p.com/index.php/2010/01/03/reconstructing-leonora-sansay>
 Vietto, Angela. Leonora Sansay, "American Women Prose Writers to 1820," Carla Mulford, Angela Vietto, and Amy E. Winans, eds. (Detroit: Gale Research, 1999. Dictionary of Literary Biography Vol. 200).

External links 
 
 Reconstructing Leonora Sansay
 Leonora Sansay Research

1773 births
1821 deaths
19th-century American novelists
19th-century American women writers
American letter writers
Women letter writers
American women novelists
Female travelers
People of the Haitian Revolution
American women travel writers
Writers from Philadelphia
American travel writers
Women of the Haitian Revolution
Novelists from Pennsylvania